Nikolay Mamonov is a former Soviet speedskater.

He set a world record in 5,000 m in Medeo in 1952, with a time of 8:03.7.

World records 

Source: SpeedSkatingStats.com

References

External links

Year of birth missing (living people)
Living people
Soviet male speed skaters
World record setters in speed skating